Road to Rio is a 1931 German crime film directed by Manfred Noa and starring Maria Matray, Oskar Homolka and Oskar Marion. It premiered on 15 January 1931. It was shot at the Babelsberg Studios in Potsdam. The film's sets were designed by the art directors Hans Sohnle and Otto Erdmann.

Cast
 Maria Matray as Inge Weber - das Opfer
 Oskar Homolka as Ricardo
 Oskar Marion as Karl Plattke
 Senta Söneland as Berta Andersen, Hotel Manager
 Louis Ralph as Felice
 Hertha von Walther as Marietta
 Kurt Gerron as Director for Casino
 Julius Falkenstein as Muchica, Pantagenbesitzer
 Eduard von Winterstein as Polizeikommissär
 Alexa von Porembsky as Die Unerfahrene
 Eugen Rex
 Maria Forescu
 Ernst Reicher
 Gustav Püttjer
 Karl Platen
 Fritz Greiner
 Erwin van Roy
 Georg Schmieter
 Loo Hardy
 Angelo Ferrari
 Aruth Wartan

References

Bibliography
 Grange, William. Cultural Chronicle of the Weimar Republic. Scarecrow Press, 2008.

External links

1931 films
Films of the Weimar Republic
1931 crime films
German crime films
1930s German-language films
Films directed by Manfred Noa
Films based on short fiction
Films set in Rio de Janeiro (city)
German black-and-white films
Films about prostitution in Brazil
Films scored by Friedrich Hollaender
Films shot at Babelsberg Studios
1930s German films